The 2017 Memorial of Hubert Jerzy Wagner was a volleyball tournament held at the Tauron Arena in Kraków, Poland from 11 to 13 August 2017. Like the previous edition, 4 teams participated in the tournament. 

Poland won 2 of 3 matches and won the competition 7th time. The last match of tournament was the decisive match, where Poland beat Russia in tie-break. Maxim Mikhaylov from Russia was awarded the Most Valuable Player.

Qualification
All teams except the host must have received an invitation from the organizers.

Squads

Venue

Results
All times are Central European Summer Time (UTC+02:00).

|}

|}

Final standing

Awards

Most Valuable Player
  Maxim Mikhaylov
Best Setter
  Benjamin Toniutti
Best Outside Spikers
  Dmitry Volkov
  Steven Marshall

Best Middle Blockers
  Bartłomiej Lemański
  Ilyas Kurkaev
Best Opposite Spiker
  Dawid Konarski
Best Libero
  Jenia Grebennikov

References

External links
Official website

Memorial of Hubert Jerzy Wagner
Memorial of Hubert Jerzy Wagner
Memorial of Hubert Jerzy Wagner
Sports competitions in Kraków
May 2017 sports events in Europe
21st century in Kraków